The 1985–86 Thorn EMI Rugby Union County Championship was the 86th edition of England's County Championship rugby union club competition.

Warwickshire won their ninth title after defeating Kent in the final.

Semi finals

Final

See also
 English rugby union system
 Rugby union in England

References

Rugby Union County Championship
County Championship (rugby union) seasons